The Others is the self-titled debut studio album by English band The Others. The album was released on 31 January 2005 in the UK on Mercury Records. In 2010, Q included the album in their list "The Fifty Worst Albums Ever!"

Critical reception
The Others was met with "mixed or average" reviews from critics. At Metacritic, which assigns a weighted average rating out of 100 to reviews from mainstream publications, this release received an average score of 52 based on 9 reviews.

In a review for AllMusic, Jason Damas wrote: "The Others' eponymous debut borrows from the sneering, dingy punk rock of the Sex Pistols, but slowed down and delivered more menacingly while opting for a scathing, unpretentious, and populist take on nu-new wave." Damas went on to say the tracks sound "unnecessarily limp and under-written, rendering the entire affair a mere display of this band's potential."

Track listing

Singles
Four singles were released from The Others, all of which charted on the UK Singles Chart.

Charts

References

2005 debut albums
The Others (band) albums
Mercury Records albums